COTA Australia (Formerly known as the Council on the Ageing) is a registered Australian charity representing people aged over 50 in Australia. 

COTA Australia is a federation, with member organizations in each of the eight Australian states and territories.

Functions 

COTA works with government, business, the media and the wider community, to advocate for older Australians. It works in a wide range of policy areas of interest to older Australians, including:
 Aged Care
 Health
 Ageism
 Employment
 Retirement incomes
 Essential services

COTA's state and territory branches also advocate for older people on a state level.

See also

 Philanthropy
 Corporate social responsibility
 Social responsibility

References

External links
 

Charities for the elderly
Old age in Australia